Cement is a 2000 American thriller crime drama film directed by Adrian Pasdar and written by Justin Monjo. The film was shot in Los Angeles, California and was Pasdar's first film as director.

Plot
Los Angeles vice detectives Bill Holt (Chris Penn) and Nin (Jeffrey Wright) have entered the gangster and drug scenes and have allied with drug kingpin Truman Rickhardt (Henry Czerny). As he tries to stop Holt, Nin narrates the events that led Holt to torture Truman's brother Sean (Anthony DeSando) by chaining him inside an iron box that's slowly filling with cement. Cops on the take, missing money, Holt's tempting wife Lyndel (Sherilyn Fenn), dead police officers are implicated in the events.

Featured cast
 Chris Penn as Bill Holt
 Jeffrey Wright as Nin
 Anthony DeSando as Sean Rickhart
 Sherilyn Fenn as Lyndel Holt
 Henry Czerny as Truman Rickhart
 Gregory Jbara as Fergus Rickhart
 Titus Welliver as Mo
 Yorgo Constantine as Danny
 Richard Edson as Robbo
 Kevin Jackson as Carter
 Max Martini as Mic

Awards
2000: AngelCiti film festival: Audience Award, Adrian Pasdar, D.J. Paul

2000 crime drama films
2000 crime thriller films
2000 films
2000 directorial debut films
2000s English-language films
Films directed by Adrian Pasdar
American independent films
Lionsgate films
American neo-noir films
American crime drama films
2000 independent films
2000s American films